The Tadiran Mastiff is a battlefield UAV built by Tadiran Electronic Industries, regarded by some military historians as the world's first modern military drone.

Design and development
It first flew in 1973. It featured a data-link system and miniaturized electronics that fed live and high-resolution video coverage of the targeted area to operators. It is thus seen by some as the first modern surveillance UAV. The combination of its long flight endurance of over 7 hours and real-time video streaming gave Israeli forces unprecedented depth of coverage, speed of information delivery and on-station surveillance time.

As a result of the 1973 Yom Kippur War the Israeli Defence Forces came with an operational requirement to give the field commanders the ability to look "over the hill". The first operational requirements called for a vehicle that would be able to carry a 10 kg payload to ranges of 30–50 km.

Tadiran started developing the Mastiff Mini RPV (Remote Piloted Vehicle) after being approached by a group of entrepreneurs who were looking for Tadiran to provide the Mastiff radio command.

Three generations of the Mastiff developed by Tadiran were in operational use by the IDF performing numerous operational missions, the most well known of them was flown during the first Lebanon war when Yasser Arafat was caught by the Mastiff video camera.

Previous Operators 
Israel Army

Republic of Singapore Air Force

Specifications

See also

References

External links

 Israeli UAVs: Mastiff, Scout, and Searcher series

1970s Israeli military reconnaissance aircraft
Unmanned military aircraft of Israel